Department of Interior may refer to:

 Department of the Interior (1932–39), an Australian government department that existed 1932–1939
 Department of the Interior (1939–72), an Australian government department that existed 1939–1972
 United States Department of the Interior
 Ministry of Interior, a government department typically responsible for policing, emergency management, national security, elections, and immigration
 List of interior ministries in different countries and their heads